Pomer is a village in the municipality of Medulin, in southern Istria in Croatia. In 2001 it had a population of 386.

References

Populated places in Istria County